Shipshewana is a town in Newbury Township, LaGrange County, Indiana, United States. The population was 658 at the 2010 census. It is the location of the Menno-Hof Amish & Mennonite Museum, which showcases the history of the Amish and Mennonite peoples.

History
Shipshewana was named after a local Potawatomi Indian. The Shipshewana post office was established in 1889.

Geography

Demographics

2010 census

As of the census of 2010, there were 658 people, 297 households, and 177 families living in the town. The racial makeup of the town was 98.3% White, 0.2% African American, 0.5% Native American, 0.2% Asian, 0.3% from other races, and 0.6% from two or more races. Hispanic or Latino of any race were 0.8% of the population.

There were 297 households, of which 26.9% had children under the age of 18 living with them, 47.1% were married couples living together, 9.8% had a female householder with no husband present, 2.7% had a male householder with no wife present, and 40.4% were non-families. 36.4% of all households were made up of individuals, and 14.8% had someone living alone who was 65 years of age or older. The average household size was 2.22 and the average family size was 2.86.

The median age in the town was 37.7 years. 24.2% of residents were under the age of 18; 9.8% were between the ages of 18 and 24; 22.6% were from 25 to 44; 21.5% were from 45 to 64; and 22% were 65 years of age or older. The gender makeup of the town was 44.7% male and 55.3% female.

2000 census

As of the census of 2000, there were 536 people, 235 households, and 149 families living in the town. The racial makeup of the town was 97.57% White, 0.37% African American, 0.19% Native American, 0.19% from other races, and 1.68% from two or more races. Hispanic or Latino of any race were 1.12% of the population.

There were 235 households, out of which 29.4% had children under the age of 18 living with them, 48.1% were married couples living together, 12.3% had a female householder with no husband present, and 36.2% were non-families. 33.6% of all households were made up of individuals, and 17.4% had someone living alone who was 65 years of age or older.  The average household size was 2.28 and the average family size was 2.86.

In the town, the population was spread out, with 24.1% under the age of 18, 12.7% from 18 to 24, 21.3% from 25 to 44, 23.9% from 45 to 64, and 18.1% who were 65 years of age or older.  The median age was 36 years. For every 100 females, there were 79.3 males.  For every 100 females age 18 and over, there were 79.3 males.

The median income for a household in the town was $30,156, and the median income for a family was $53,214. Males had a median income of $36,875 versus $22,750 for females. The per capita income for the town was $26,270.  About 6.0% of families and 8.0% of the population were below the poverty line, including 2.9% of those under age 18 and 20.8% of those age 65 or over.

Economy

In 2014, the Shipshewana-LaGrange County Convention and Visitor's Bureau commissioned a CERTEC study to gauge the impact of tourism. According to that study the tourism and travel industry contributed nearly $137.2 million to the LaGrange County economy in 2013.

Transportation
Shipshewana is served by Barons Bus Lines Schedule 0025: Cleveland, Ohio to Chicago, Illinois; and Schedule 0026: Chicago, Illinois to Cleveland, Ohio. This is an on-demand bus stop for both schedule 0025 and 0026.  Both routes feature local service via primarily US Route 20. These routes are an essential transportation service sharing similarities to that of the Essential Air Service, primarily funded by tax payers.

Education
The town is served by the Westview School Corporation, in nearby Topeka.

Shipshewana has a public library, a branch of the La Grange County Public Library.

References

External links

 
 Shipshewana.org - A Town of Character!
 Shipshewana.com - Links to All Things Shipshewana!
 Visit Shipshewana LCCVB - Visit Shipshewana - Plan Your Trip!
 Municipal info for Town of Shipshewana, Indiana
 City-Data.com

Towns in LaGrange County, Indiana
Towns in Indiana
Amish in Indiana